Corinth is a town in Greece.

It may also refer to:

Related to Corinth, Greece
Ancient Corinth, the city-state in Classical Antiquity
Battle of Corinth (146 BC)
Corinth Canal
Gulf of Corinth
Isthmus of Corinth
League of Corinth
Corinth Refinery

Places in the United States
 Corinth, Bullock County, Alabama, an unincorporated community
 Corinth, Clay County, Alabama, an unincorporated community
 Corinth, Cullman County, Alabama, an unincorporated community
 Corinth (north), Randolph County, Alabama, an unincorporated community
 Corinth (south), Randolph County, Alabama, an unincorporated community
 Corinth, Walker County, Alabama, an unincorporated community
 Corinth, Winston County, Alabama, a ghost town
 Plantersville, Alabama, formerly known as Corinth
 Corinth, Arkansas, a town
 Corinth, Bradley County, Arkansas
 Corinth, Howard County, Arkansas
 Corinth, Polk County, Arkansas
 Corinth, Georgia, an unincorporated community and former town
 Corinth, Sumter County, Georgia, a ghost town
 Corinth, Walker County, Georgia, an unincorporated community
 Corinth, Illinois, an unincorporated community
 Corinth Township, Humboldt County, Iowa
 Corinth, Kansas, an unincorporated community
 Corinth, Kentucky, a city
 Corinth, Logan County, Kentucky
 Corinth, Louisiana, an unincorporated community
 Corinth, Maine, a town
 Corinth, Michigan, an unincorporated community in Kent County
 Corinth, Phelps County, Missouri
 Corinth, Mississippi, a city
 Corinth, Perry County, Mississippi
 Corinth, Montana, an unincorporated community
 Corinth (town), New York
 Corinth (village), New York
 Corinth, Chatham County, North Carolina
 Corinth, Nash County, North Carolina
 Corinth, Rutherford County, North Carolina
 Banoak, North Carolina, also known as Corinth
 Corinth, North Dakota, an unincorporated community
 Corinth, Ohio
 Corinth, South Carolina, in Oconee County
 Corinth, Saluda County, South Carolina
 Corinth, Knox County, Tennessee, an unincorporated community
 Corinth, Sumner County, Tennessee, an unincorporated community
 Corinth, Texas, a city in Denton County
 Corinth, Henderson County, Texas, a ghost town
 Corinth, Jones County, Texas, an unincorporated community
 Corinth, Lee County, Texas, an unincorporated community
 Corinth, Leon County, Texas, an unincorporated community
 Corinth, Marion County, Texas, a ghost town
 Corinth, Milam County, Texas, an unincorporated community
 Corinth, Montague County, Texas, an unincorporated community
 Corinth, Panola County, Texas, an unincorporated community
 Corinth, Van Zandt County, Texas, a ghost town
 Second Corinth, Texas
 Corinth, Vermont, a town
 Corinth, Carroll County, Virginia
 Corinth, Southampton County, Virginia
 Corinth, West Virginia, an unincorporated community
 Corinth, Wisconsin, an unincorporated community
 Corinth-Holder (Hocutts Crossroads), North Carolina

Other uses
Lovis Corinth, German painter
Siege of Corinth (April–June 1862), American Civil War siege of Corinth, Mississippi
Second Battle of Corinth (October 1862), American Civil War battle at Corinth, Mississippi
Corinth Christian Methodist Episcopal Church, Winchester, Kentucky
Corinth Baptist Church, Union, South Carolina
Corinth, Pennsylvania, a fictitious city in the TV series Loving
Corinth, a domed city that serves as the setting of the TV series Power Rangers: RPM

See also
Corinto (disambiguation), places with Spanish or Portuguese names
Carinthia (disambiguation), places in Central Europe